John Goodman is an American actor known for his performances in film, television and theatre.

He became a household name for his portrayal as the patriarch in the ABC sitcom Roseanne (1988-1997). He earned 7 Primetime Emmy Award nominations for Outstanding Lead Actor in a Comedy Series for the role. He also received three Golden Globe Award nominations and a Screen Actors Guild Award nomination for his performance. He has earned  a single Primetime Emmy Award, Golden Globe Award, and Screen Actors Guild Award for Studio 60 on the Sunset Strip (2007), Roseanne (1994), and Argo (2011) respectively.

Major associations

Primetime Emmy Awards

Golden Globe Awards

Screen Actors Guild Awards

Miscellaneous awards

See also 
 John Goodman on screen and stage

References

Goodman, John